Visual snow syndrome (VSS) is an uncommon neurological condition in which the primary symptom is that affected individuals see persistent flickering white, black, transparent, or coloured dots across the whole visual field. Other common symptoms are palinopsia, enhanced entoptic phenomena, photophobia, insomnia, and headaches. The condition is typically always present and has no known cure, as viable treatments are still under research. Migraine and tinnitus are common comorbidities and are both associated with a more severe presentation of the syndrome.

The cause of the syndrome is unclear.  The underlying mechanism is believed to involve excessive excitability of neurons in the right lingual gyrus and left anterior lobe of cerebellum. Another hypothesis proposes that visual snow syndrome could be a type of thalamocortical dysrhythmia and may involve the thalamic reticular nucleus (TRN). A failure of inhibitory action from the TRN to the thalamus may be the underlying cause for inability to suppress excitatory sensory information. Research has been limited due to issues of case identification and diagnosis, the latter now largely addressed, and the limited size of any studied cohort. Initial functional brain imaging research suggests visual snow is a brain disorder.

There is no established treatment for visual snow syndrome. Medications that may be used to treat the condition include lamotrigine, acetazolamide, or verapamil. However, in absence of a secondary pharmaceutical indication, these do not necessarily result in benefits, and the evidence for their use is limited.

Signs and symptoms

In addition to visual snow, many of those affected have other types of visual disturbances such as starbursts, increased afterimages, floaters, trails, and many others.

Visual snow likely represents a clinical continuum, with different degrees of severity. The presence of comorbidities such as migraine and tinnitus is associated with a more severe presentation of the visual symptoms.

Diagnosis

Visual snow syndrome is usually diagnosed with the following proposed criteria:

 Visual snow: dynamic, continuous, tiny dots in the entire visual field lasting more than three months.
 The dots are usually black/gray on a white background and gray/white on a black background; however, they can also be transparent, white flashing, or colored.
 Presence of at least 2 additional visual symptoms of the 4 following categories:
 i. Palinopsia. At least 1 of the following: afterimages or trailing of moving objects.
 ii. Enhanced entoptic phenomena. At least 1 of the following: excessive floaters in both eyes, excessive blue field entoptic phenomenon, self-light of the eye (phosphenes), or spontaneous photopsia.
 iii. Photophobia.
 iv. Nyctalopia; impaired night vision.
 Symptoms are not consistent with typical migraine aura.
 Symptoms are not better explained by another disorder (ophthalmological, drug abuse).
 Normal ophthalmology tests (best-corrected visual acuity, dilated fundus examination, visual field, and electroretinogram); not caused by previous intake of psychotropic drugs.

Additional and non visual symptoms like tinnitus, ear pressure or brain fog and more might be present. It can also be diagnosed by PET scan.

Comorbidities

Migraine and migraine with aura are common comorbidities. However, comorbid migraine worsens some of the additional visual symptoms and tinnitus seen in "visual snow" syndrome. This might bias research studies by patients with migraine being more likely to offer study participation than those without migraine due to having more severe symptoms. In contrast to migraine, comorbidity of typical migraine aura does not appear to worsen symptoms.

Psychological side effects of visual snow can include depersonalization, derealization, depression, photophobia and heliophobia in the individual affected.

Patients with visual "snow" have normal equivalent input noise levels and contrast sensitivity. In a 2010 study, Raghaven et al. hypothesize that what the patients see as "snow" is eigengrau. This would also explain why many report more visual snow in low light conditions: "The intrinsic dark noise of primate cones is equivalent to ~4000 absorbed photons per second at mean light levels; below this the cone signals are dominated by intrinsic noise".

Causes
The causes are unclear. The underlying mechanism is believed to involve excessive excitability of neurons within the cortex of the brain, specifically the right lingual gyrus and left cerebellar anterior lobe of the brain.

Persisting visual snow can feature as a leading addition to a migraine complication called persistent aura without infarction, commonly referred to as persistent migraine aura (PMA). In other clinical sub-forms of migraine headache may be absent and the migraine aura may not take the typical form of the zigzagged fortification spectrum (scintillating scotoma), but manifests with a large variety of focal neurological symptoms.

Visual snow does not depend on the effect of psychotropic substances on the brain. Hallucinogen persisting perception disorder (HPPD), a condition caused by hallucinogenic drug use, is sometimes linked to visual snow, but both the connection of visual snow to HPPD and the cause and prevalence of HPPD is disputed. Most of the evidence for both is generally anecdotal, and subject to spotlight fallacy.

Another proposed mechanism is a thalamocortical dysrhythmia of the visual pathway, similar to tinnitus, which is a thalamocortical dysrhythmia of the auditory pathway.

Timeline
 In May 2015, visual snow was described as a persisting positive visual phenomenon distinct from migraine aura in a study by Schankin and Goadsby.
 In December 2020, a study found local increases in regional cerebral perfusion in patients with visual snow syndrome.
 In May 2021, University of Zurich researchers announced a clinical trial on neurofeedback for visual snow syndrome.
 In June 2021, University of Colorado researchers started recruiting for a clinical trial on transcranial magnetic stimulation for visual snow syndrome.
 In September 2021, two studies found white matter alterations in parts of the visual cortex and outside the visual cortex in patients with visual snow syndrome.

Treatments
It is difficult to resolve visual snow with treatment, but it is possible to reduce symptoms and improve quality of life through treatment, both of the syndrome and its comorbidities. Medications that may be used include lamotrigine, acetazolamide, or verapamil, but these do not always result in benefits. As of 2021, there were two ongoing clinical trials using transcranial magnetic stimulation and neurofeedback for visual snow.

A recent study in the British Journal of Ophthalmology has confirmed that common drug treatments are generally ineffective in visual snow syndrome (VSS). Vitamins and benzodiazepines, however, were shown to be beneficial in some patients and can be considered safe for this condition.

Victoria Pelak, a Professor of Neurology and Ophthalmology in the Department of Neurology at the University of Colorado Anschutz Medical Campus has recently directed, published, and completed enrollment for a TMS study protocol. The study protocol aims to investigate the use of rTMS intervention to improve symptoms and visual dysfunction associated with visual snow (VS); the study protocol also describes the challenges during the COVID-19 pandemic.

In addition, Pelak described during her practice that she lets patients know that current treatment options are only limited to alleviating symptoms. She recommends that her patients focus on pharmaceutical and non-pharmaceutical treatments to control migraine, headaches, anxiety, and depression. As for light sensitivity complications, Pelak advises patients to use FL-41 tinted lenses indoors. She also recommends visual occupational therapists who assist patients with color-tinted lenses to alleviate VSS symptoms. Furthermore, Pelak states that exercising, meditation, and a healthy balanced diet can improve overall daily functioning.

References

External links 
Visual Snow Initiative   
Visual snow syndrome at NIH
 http://visualsnowsyndrome.com/
 
Eye On Vision Foundation

Visual disturbances and blindness
Hallucinations
Ailments of unknown cause
Medical controversies
Migraine